White Rose Food Division (est. 1886) of DiGiorgio Corporation was the largest independent food wholesaler and distributor in the New York metropolitan area. It was mainly distributed at member supermarkets of the cool buying and marketing Co-operative Associated Supermarkets including Met Foods and Pioneer and had a large presence in the supermarket Western Beef. White Rose food could also be found in Thriftway/Shop'n'Bag stores in the Philadelphia, PA region.

White Rose utilized power from KDC Solar and had the second-largest rooftop solar panel in Carteret, New Jersey.

In 2014, White Rose filed for bankruptcy and sold its assets to C&S Wholesale Grocers, Inc.

References

External links
 

Food and drink companies established in 1886
Food and drink companies of the United States
Food and drink companies based in New Jersey